The 2008 World University Squash Championship is the edition of the 2008's World University Squash, which serves as the individual world squash championship for students. The event took place in Cairo in Egypt from 22 August to 28 August.

Draw and results

Men's Single

Women's Single

Team Event

See also
World University Squash Championships
World Squash Federation

References

External links
SquashSite World University 2008 website

Squash tournaments in Egypt
World University
World University Squash Championships
World University Squash Championships
Squash